Sheykh Shaban (also Romanized as Sheykh Shabān) is a village in Howmeh Rural District of the Central District of Ben County, Chaharmahal and Bakhtiari province, Iran. At the 2006 census, its population was 2,689 in 666 households, when it was in the former Ben District of Shahrekord County. The following census in 2011 counted 2,586 people in 732 households. The latest census in 2016 showed a population of 2,683 people in 842 households, by which time it was in the newly established Ben County; it was the largest village in its rural district.

References 

Ben County

Populated places in Chaharmahal and Bakhtiari Province

Populated places in Ben County